Muzaferija is a surname. Notable people with the surname include:

Armin Muzaferija (born 1988), Bosnian singer
Elvedina Muzaferija (born 1999), female alpine skier from Bosnia and Herzegovina
Zaim Muzaferija (born 1923 - died 2003), a Bosnian film, television and stage actor

Bosnian surnames